William Albert Hudson  (known as Billy Hudson) (10 March 1928 – February 2014 ) was a Welsh footballer who played in the Football League for Leeds United, Sheffield United and Mansfield Town  in the 1950s as an outside right.

After coming out of the armed forces he joined Pembroke Borough. He made four league appearances for Leeds United before leaving for Sheffield United in May 1952, where he played briefly, and was signed by Mansfield Town in May 1954. He was released a free transfer in 1955 after eight league appearances.

His uncle, Albert Hudson, was a former Fulham, Llanelly and Pembroke player.

References

1928 births
2014 deaths
Welsh footballers
English Football League players
Association football forwards
Pembroke Borough A.F.C. players
Leeds United F.C. players
Sheffield United F.C. players
Mansfield Town F.C. players
Wales amateur international footballers